Duddingston Kirk is a Parish Church in the Church of Scotland, located adjacent to Holyrood Park in Duddingston Village, on the east side of the City of Edinburgh. Regular services are held at the kirk, conducted by the minister, Rev Dr James A. P. Jack (from 2001).

History
Cassel identifies the building as being Anglo-Saxon (i.e pre Norman conquest).

The church was built in or around 1124 by Dodin, a Norman knight, on land granted to Kelso Abbey by King David I of Scotland. As originally built, the kirk consisted of the chancel, nave and square tower. The traditional pattern of an east–west axis was adopted. The original entrance on the south wall includes a particularly fine example of Scoto-Norman stone carving, with a round-topped doorway. Following the enlargement of the parish boundaries, the Prestonfield Aisle was added in 1631. This consists of a gallery, downstairs area and burial vaults were on the north side. In 1968 the kirk’s interior was reconditioned, with the former pipe organ removed.

The entrance to the kirkyard from Duddingston village is notable for its gatehouse, built as a lookout point to deter "bodysnatchers" in the early 19th century. The Edinburgh bodysnatchers, known as "resurrectionists," stole recently buried corpses to sell to anatomists, and, as in the notorious case of Burke and Hare, sometimes also resorted to murder.

Given its proximity to central Edinburgh, Duddingston has long been a favourite location for many of the city’s artists and professionals. The novelist Walter Scott was ordained an elder at Duddingston in 1806.

The kirk has also been used as a venue during the Edinburgh Festival Fringe.

Ministers
A famous and widely admired minister in the early 19th century  (1805–1840) was the Reverend John Thomson, a notable painter and friend of Raeburn and Turner. He referred to his parishioners (and large family) as "ma bairns"  and hence one possible explanation of the popular Scottish expression "We’re a' Jock Tamson’s bairns". [Note the plaque opposite the church.)

He was replaced in 1841 by James Macfarlane FRSE DD (1808-1866), who was Moderator of the General Assembly in 1865.

The succession of ministers since the Reformation was:

1560 to 1564 - William Blackwood one of the first men to be styled "vicar"
1564 to 1574 - John Brand
1574 to 1588 - Ninian Hamilton, "exhorter"
1611 to 1630 - Charles Lumsden married Beatrice Pont daughter of Robert Pont
1630 to 1633 - Robert Monteith of Salmonet rejoined the Roman Catholic Church and became Canon of Notre Dame, Paris
1633 to 1635 - Jasper Hume MA
1635 to 1639 - Archibald Newton MA
1641 to 1686 - Charles Lumsden (secundus)
1681 to 1691 - Andrew Lumsden MA (1654-1733) son of preceding
1694 to 1704 - James Craig MA
1705 to 1754 - David Malcolm criticised for attending the wedding of George Drummond in Edinburgh
1744 to 1745 - Robert Pollock MA, later Principal of Marischal College in Aberdeen
1746 to 1785 - William Bennet (d.1785)
1786 to 1805 - William Bennet (d.1805) nephew of preceding - drowned in Duddingston Loch adjoining the church
1805 to 1840 - John Thomson (see above)
1841 to 1866 - James Macfarlane FRSE DD (1809-1866) Moderator in 1865
1866 to 1911 - John Allan Hunter Paton (1830-1911)
1903 to ? - William Serle

Stained Glass
The north triple window in the gallery is dedicated to Joan Carfrae, wife of the famous detective, Allan Pinkerton, who was born in Duddingston in 1822 and died in Chicago in 1887. The window is designed by Douglas Strachan.

The stained glass immediately east of the pulpit commemorates Dr Stevenson Macadam, an elder in the church.

Duddingston Kirkyard
Notable burials and memorials include:

William Henry Dick-Cunyngham VC (memorial only)
Rev David Thomas Ker Drummond
Benjamin Duff Dunbar (1808-1897)
Very Rev James Macfarlane
Very Rev Mackintosh MacKay (1792-1873) Moderator of the General Assembly of the Free Church of Scotland in 1849
Thomas Meik engineer
James Browne LLD is apparently in the base of the church tower.
Rev John Thomson of Duddingston

See also
 Duddingston
 Edinburgh
 Church of Scotland
 List of Church of Scotland parishes

References

External links
 Duddingston Kirk
 Church of Scotland Presbytery of Edinburgh

Churches completed in 1124
12th-century church buildings in Scotland
Category A listed buildings in Edinburgh
Church of Scotland churches in Edinburgh
Listed churches in Scotland
Protestant churches converted from Roman Catholicism